Tenacibaculum jejuense is a Gram-negative, strictly aerobic and rod-shaped bacterium from the genus of Tenacibaculum which has been isolated from seawater from the coast of Jeju Island in Korea.

References 

Flavobacteria
Bacteria described in 2012